The Big Sister is a lost 1916 American drama silent film directed by John B. O'Brien and written by Harvey F. Thew. The film stars Mae Murray, Matty Roubert, Harry C. Browne, Ida Darling, Armand Cortes and Tammany Young. The film was released on September 7, 1916, by Paramount Pictures.

Plot
Escaping Nifty Mendez, a slave trader who framed their father, Betty Norton and younger brother Jimmy are on the run when the boy is hit by a car that fractures his leg. The driver, Rodney Channing, insists on hosting Jimmy during his convalescence and so, dating the beautiful Betty, he falls in love with her and the couple begin to plan a future together.

But Mendez, having learned of the thing, threatens the girl, whose father is in prison: if he does not pay for her silence, he will reveal her past to the betrothed, thus messing up the wedding. Betty, however, does not give in to blackmail: she herself writes a letter to Rodney where she tells him her story and then runs away.

When Mendez is killed in a showdown, Betty is free. Rodney, who was looking for her, finally finds her: he doesn't care about his father, he just wants her. The doors of a radiant future open wide to the two.

Cast   
Mae Murray as Betty Norton
Matty Roubert as Jimmy Norton
Harry C. Browne as Rodney Channing
Ida Darling as Mrs. Spaulding
Armand Cortes as Nifty Mendez
Tammany Young as Joe Kelly
Florence Flinn as Edith
Joseph Gleason as Robert Colton
J. Albert Hall as Norton

References

External links 
 

1916 films
1910s English-language films
Silent American drama films
1916 drama films
Lost American films
Paramount Pictures films
American black-and-white films
American silent feature films
1916 lost films
Lost drama films
Films directed by John B. O'Brien
1910s American films